Pannagam (also spelt Pannakam, Pannaakam, Pannaagam) is a small village in the minority Sri Lankan Tamil dominated Jaffna peninsula of Sri Lanka.

Demography
Most of the residents of the village are Sri Lankan Tamils with majority being Hindus and a minority Christians of various sects. As of 2007, due to the effects of the Sri Lankan civil war the actual number of residents is unknown.

Notable people
 Appapillai Amirthalingam, Tamil politician

References

Villages in Jaffna District
Valikamam West DS Division